Sajjad Danaei (born 3 October 1996, Mashhad)  is an Iranian football player who plays as a right-back for Persian Gulf Pro League club Zobahan.

Among the teams he played for, we can mention Siah jamgan, Fajr spasi, Havadar and Zob ahan. He also has the ability to play as a right midfielder.

Club career

Zob Ahan 

He joined Zob Ahan on August 21, 2021 with a contract.

Honours 
Havadar
Azadegan League Runner-up (1): 2020–21

References

External Links 
 Danaei at footba11.co 
 Danaei at PersianLeague.com

Living people
Sportspeople from Mashhad
1996 births
Iranian footballers
Association football defenders
Persian Gulf Pro League players
F.C. Aboomoslem players
Siah Jamegan players
Havadar S.C. players
Zob Ahan Esfahan F.C. players